The county executive of St. Louis County, Missouri is the chief executive officer of St. Louis County's government.

County executives

Presiding Justices, Court of Quarter Sessions

Presiding Justices, County Court

President of the Board of Commissioners

Presiding Justices, County Court

County Executives

Notes

 A.  The fractional terms of some county executives are not to be understood absolutely literally; rather, they are meant to show single terms during which multiple county executives served, due to resignations, deaths and the like.
 B.  McNary resigned from office to head the federal Immigration and Naturalization Service.
 C.  Westfall died while in office.
 D.  Dooley was made the acting county executive on October 14, 2003.
 E.  Stenger resigned after federal indictment.

References
General
 
 
 
 

Specific